The Central Committee of the 1st Conference of the Russian Social Democratic Labour Party, better known as the Tampere conference of 1905, was in session from 1905 until 1906.

Composition

References

Citations

Bibliography
 

Central Committee elected by the 04
1905 establishments in the Russian Empire
1906 disestablishments in the Russian Empire